Pozo de Jacinto (Jacinto's Pit Cave) is a blowhole located at Jobos Beach in the northwestern side Puerto Rican municipality of Isabela on Puerto Rico Highway 466.

Description 
Pozo de Jacinto is at Jobos Beach which is near Crash Boat Beach in Aguadilla, which borders Isabela. It's a blowhole, or limestone rock with an orifice through which ocean waves shoot up.

Folklore
A jíbaro named Jacinto often went near the cave to eat his lunch, keeping the cow's leash tied around his waist. One day, loud thunder scared the cow and he ran, fell down the pit pulling Jacinto with  him and both drowned. If Jacinto's name is called and mention of the cow is made, the ocean becomes furious and churns wildly in response.

See also
 Folklore of Puerto Rico
Jobos Beach

References

External links 
Global Location at Google Maps
Driving Location at Mapquest

Caves of Puerto Rico
Isabela, Puerto Rico
Surfing locations in Puerto Rico
Puerto Rican legends
Supernatural legends
Places in folklore
Blowholes